Rosa María "Rosie" Reyes Darmon (née Reyes; born 23 March 1939) is a retired tennis player from Mexico who was active in the 1950s and 1960s.

Most of her success came on clay on which she won the women's doubles title at the 1958 French Championships with countrywoman Yola Ramírez. She also reached the finals at the same event in 1957 and 1959. 

In singles, her best result at a Grand Slam tournament was reaching the semifinals of the 1959 French Championships in which she lost in straight sets to Zsuzsa Körmöczy of Hungary.

She competed in the women's doubles event at 1968 Summer Olympics, where tennis was reintroduced as an exhibition and demonstration event. Partnering Julie Heldman, she won the gold medal in the exhibition event, held in Mexico City, and the silver medal in the demonstration event, held in Guadalajara.

She married tennis player Pierre Darmon on 28 January 1960.

Grand Slam finals

Doubles (1 title, 2 runners-up)

Mixed doubles (1 runner-up)

Olympic finals

Doubles (1 gold, 1 silver)

Mixed Doubles (1 bronze) 

Rosie Reyes Darmon and Pierre Darmon lost in the semifinals to Peaches Bartkowicz and Ingo Buding 6–3, 2–6, 1–6. As the exhibition tournament did not feature a bronze medal play-off match, both beaten semifinal teams received bronze medals.

References

External links
 
 
 

1939 births
Living people
Mexican female tennis players
Tennis players from Mexico City
Tennis players at the 1968 Summer Olympics
Grand Slam (tennis) champions in women's doubles
Pan American Games medalists in tennis
Pan American Games gold medalists for Mexico
Pan American Games silver medalists for Mexico
Tennis players at the 1955 Pan American Games
French Championships (tennis) champions
Central American and Caribbean Games gold medalists for Mexico
Central American and Caribbean Games silver medalists for Mexico
Central American and Caribbean Games bronze medalists for Mexico
Central American and Caribbean Games medalists in tennis